Hostěradice is a municipality and village in Znojmo District in the South Moravian Region of the Czech Republic. It has about 1,600 inhabitants.

Administrative parts
Villages of Chlupice and Míšovice are administrative parts of Hostěradice.

References

Villages in Znojmo District